Le Valdécie is a former commune in the Manche department in Normandy in north-western France. On 1 January 2016, it was merged into the new commune of Bricquebec-en-Cotentin.

See also
Communes of the Manche department
Jean de Launoy

References

Valdecie